Jean-Claude Barclay and Françoise Dürr were the defending champions but lost in the final 6–3, 6–2 against Marty Riessen and Margaret Court.

Seeds

Draw

Finals

Top half

Section 1

Section 2

Bottom half

Section 3

Section 4

References

External links
1969 French Open – Doubles draws and results at the International Tennis Federation

Mixed Doubles
French Open by year – Mixed doubles